The first president of Bangladesh, Sheikh Mujibur Rahman, and most of his family were killed during the early hours of 15 August 1975 by a group of young Bangladesh Army personnel who invaded his Dhanmondi 32 residence as part of a coup d'état. Minister of Commerce Khondaker Mostaq Ahmad immediately took control of the government and proclaimed himself president. The assassination marked the first direct military intervention in Bangladesh's civilian administration-centric politics. 15 August is National Mourning Day, an official national holiday in Bangladesh.

Background

Mujib's presidency

In the 1970 Pakistani general election, Sheikh Mujib's party, the Awami League (previously known as the Awami Muslim League), won the majority of the seats in the Pakistani National Assembly. They won 167 of the 169 seats in East Pakistan, which would later become Bangladesh after it seceded from West Pakistan. Despite Pakistan's military government delaying the handover of power, Mujib's house had become the de facto head of government in East Pakistan by March. At the start of the Bangladesh Liberation War in 1971, he was arrested in his home by Pakistani soldiers on 25 March midnight just after declaring the independence of Bangladesh. Later that year, the provisional government of the Bangladeshi rebellion, the Mujibnagar Government, formed on 10 April and made Mujib its head and also the leader of Bangladeshi armed forces. Following the defeat of Pakistani forces on 16 December 1971, Sheikh Mujibur Rahman was released from custody from Pakistan in London on 22 December 1971 and flew to India followed by Bangladesh. Mujib led the government as Prime Minister of Bangladesh for three years after Bangladesh gained independence.

Jatiya Rakkhi Bahini controversy and outrage in the army

The Jatiya Rakkhi Bahini (JRB) was a controversial militia formed by Sheikh Mujibur Rahman and loyal to him personally. Although it was originally founded as a law enforcing agency to maintain internal security, it became a second national armed-force and served as a political task force for the Awami League. As a result, it found little support among traditional military organisations such as the Mukti Bahini. Its 30,000 troops intimidated and tortured opponents of the Awami League in various ways. The military grew resentful of the level of funding the Rakshi Bahini received from the Mujib government, with the former's own funding being reduced to 13% in the 1975–76 budget, a considerable decrease from the 50–60% it enjoyed during the Pakistan period. This dissatisfaction is also considered one of the reasons for Mujibur's assassination.

Allegation of nepotism and corruption within the Mujib-family
Sheikh Fazlul Haque Mani was given lucrative positions in the Government formed by Sheikh Mujibur. When private trade with India was banned due to slow inflation, Fazlul Haque actively engaged in it with Mujibur's blessings. This was seen as an attempt by Mujibur to form a dynasty.

Near the end of 1973, Sheikh Kamal was involved in a shootout in which he suffered gunshot injuries. Multiple claims have been made as to how the shootout occurred. Many people claim that it was during an attempted robbery of a bank by Sheikh Kamal and his friends. However, a retired major general of the Bangladesh Army claimed that it was actually a case of friendly fire. Near the end of 1973, Bangladeshi security forces received intelligence that the left-wing revolutionary activist Siraj Sikder and his insurgents were going to launch coordinated attacks around Dhaka. Police and other security officers were on full alert and patrolling the streets of Dhaka in plainclothes. Sheikh Kamal and his friends were armed and also patrolling the city in a microbus looking for Siraj Sikder. When the microbus was in Dhanmondi, the police mistook Sheikh Kamal and his friends for insurgents and opened fire on them, thus injuring Sheikh Kamal. However, it is also claimed that Sheikh Kamal and his friends were in Dhanmondi to test drive a new car that his friend Iqbal Hasan Mahmud Tuku had bought recently. Since Dhaka was under heavy police patrolling, police special forces under the command of the then city SP Mahamuddin Bir Bikrom opened fire on the car thinking that the passengers were miscreants.

Left-wing insurgency

A left-wing insurgency from 1972 to 1975 is widely held to be responsible for creating the conditions that led to the assassination. In 1972, a leftist group named the Jatiya Samajtantrik Dal (JSD) was founded from a split in the Bangladesh Chhatra League, the student wing of the Bangladesh Awami League. The JSD, through its armed wing Gonobahini led by Colonel Abu Taher and politician Hasanul Haq Inu, began a political massacre of government supporters, Awami League members, and police. Their campaign contributed to a breakdown of law and order in the country and paved the way for the assassination of Mujib. Hasanul Huq Inu later held the office of the Minister of Information under Sheikh Hasina's Second and Third cabinets.

Dalim-Mostafa conflict
In 1974, Gazi Golam Mostafa kidnapped Major Shariful Haque Dalim and his wife from the Dhaka Ladies Club after an argument during Dalim's cousin's wedding reception. Dalim's only brother-in-law Bappi (his wife Nimmi's brother) was attending from Canada. Mostafa's son occupied the chair in the row behind Bappi and pulled Bappi's hair from the back. Bappi scolded the boy for his behavior and told him not to sit on the row behind him anymore. Mostafa's sons (who were close friends of Sheikh Kamal) and some associates forcefully abducted Dalim, Nimmi, the groom's mother, and two of Dalim's friends (both of whom were distinguished freedom fighters) in Microbuses owned by the Red Crescent. Mostafa was taking them to the Rakhi Bahini headquarters but later took them to the residence of Sheikh Mujibur Rahman. Mujib mediated a compromise between them and made Mostafa apologize to Nimmi. When news of the abduction spread, the 1st Bengal Lancers ransacked Mostafa's and took his whole family prisoner. They also set up check posts all over the city searching for Major Dalim and the abductees. Some officers lost their jobs as a result. The officers involved, including Shariful Haque Dalim, were later orchestrators of the coup on 15 August 1975 and the assassination of Sheikh Mujib.

Rise and death of Siraj Sikder

Siraj Sikder was contemporary leading Bangladeshi maoist leader, in Mujib's regime. Born in 1944, he obtained an engineering degree from the East Pakistan University of Engineering and Technology (now BUET) in 1967. While he was a student he became a member of East Pakistan Student Union. In 1967, he was elected vice-president of the central committee of Student Union and later that year he joined the C & B Department of the government as an engineer. Later he left his job to start a private engineering company. On 8 January 1968, along with like-minded activists, Sikder formed a clandestine organisation named Purba Bangla Sramik Andolon (East Bengal Workers Movement EBWM) with an objective to lead a struggle against the revisionism of the existing "Communist" organisations and to form a revolutionary Communist Party. This initiative brought forward a thesis that East Bengal is a colony of Pakistan and that the principal contradiction in the society is between the bureaucratic bourgeoisie and feudalists of Pakistan on one hand, and the people of East Bengal on the other hand. Only the independence struggle to form an "independent, democratic, peaceful, non-aligned, progressive" People's Republic of East Bengal, free also from the oppression of US imperialism, Soviet social-imperialism and Indian Expansionism could lead the society forward towards socialism and communism. In late 1968, Sikder left the job to establish the Mao Tse Tung Research Center in Dhaka but it was later closed down by the Pakistani government. Sikder became a lecturer at the Technical Training College in Dhaka. In the meantime of Bangladesh War of Independence, at a liberated base area named Pearabagan at Bhimruly in Jhalokati District in the southern part of the country, on 3 June 1971, Sikder founded a new party named Purba Banglar Sarbahara Party (Proletarian Party of East Bengal) by ideology of Marxism and Mao Tsetung Thought (not "Maoism", during the 1960s the followers of Mao-line used to identify their ideology as Marxism-Leninism-Mao Tse-tung Thought). At the beginning of the war, he went to Barisal and he declared that as a free living space and making it his base attempted to initiate his revolution throughout other places. After the Independence of Bangladesh he turned against the Sheikh Mujib government. In April 1973, he formed Purba Banglar Jatiya Mukti Front (East Bengal National Liberation Front) and declared war on Bangladesh Government. Under his leadership, the Sarbahara party carried out attacks against money lenders and landlords. In 1975, Sikder was arrested at Hali Shahar in Chittagong by the intelligence force of the government. He was killed in police custody on 3 January 1975 on his way from Dhaka Airport to the Rakkhi Bahini Camp at Savar. Anthony Mascarenhas narrated in his book "Bangladesh: A Legacy of Blood" that, Siraj's sister Shamim Sikder blamed Mujib for the killing of her brother.

Corruption, malfunction and BAKSAL

Sheikh Mujib later made himself President of Bangladesh and established a national unity government, the Bangladesh Krishak Sramik Awami League (BAKSAL), on 7 June 1975 by banning all political parties and independent press. Mujib named the reform as Second Revolution. Although the BAKSAL was intended to bring stability to Bangladesh and uphold law and order, it engendered hostility among the bureaucracy, military, and civil society. Opposition groups, as well as some of Mujib's supporters, challenged Mujib's authoritarian, one-party state. The period of the BAKSAL's one-party rule was marked by widespread censorship and abuse of the judiciary, as well as opposition from the general populace, intellectuals, and all other political groups. The country was in chaos: corruption was rampant, and food shortages and poor distribution led to a disastrous famine, where approximately 300,000 to 4,500,000 (or 1 to 1.5 million) people died. Many analysts claimed this famine as one of the major cause for killing Sheikh Mujib. Nationalization of industry failed to yield any tangible progress. Not only was the government weak and with no clear goals, but the country was also nearly bankrupt. In the Far Eastern Economic Review, journalist Lawrence Lifschultz wrote in 1974 that "the corruption and malpractices and plunder of national wealth" in Bangladesh were "unprecedented".

Party-partiality against rape-murder case 
The army was already dissatisfied with Sheikh Mujib for sidelining them in favor of the JRB. However, in his book Bangladesh: A Legacy of Blood, Anthony Mascarenhas cited a specific factor behind the final outcry as influential: Mozammel, a contemporary Awami League youth leader from Tongi and the chairman of Tongi Awami League, seized a car of a newlywed housewife, killed her driver and husband, abducted her and gang-raped her and three days later, her dead body was found in the road near a bridge of Tongi. Mozammel was arrested by a leader of a squadron of the Bengal Lancer named Major Nasser and handed over to the police, but the police released him immediately. At that time, many people thought that he was released from the punishment of that crime only with the intervention of Sheikh Mujib. This incident increased the dissatisfaction against Sheikh Mujib in the Army, specially in Major Faruque and acted as one of the prominently last-minute influences behind his assassination.

Conspirators
Major Syed Faruque Rahman; Khandaker Abdur Rashid; Shariful Haque Dalim; Mohiuddin Ahmed; and Rashed Chowdhury, along with A.K.M. Mohiuddin Ahmed, Bazlul Huda, and S.H.M.B Noor Chowdhury (three majors in the Bangladesh Army and veterans of the Bangladesh Liberation War), planned to topple the government and establish a military government of their own. They were previously part of the opposition to BAKSAL and viewed the government as too subservient to India and as a threat to Bangladesh's military. According to Anthony Mascarenhas, Faruque offered Major Ziaur Rahman indirectly to take part in the plan and tried to convince him, but Zia cleverly avoided the matter. According to Farooq, Zia's gesture meant: "I'm sorry, I don't want to get involved in this. If you junior officers want to do something, you should do it yourself. Don't drag me into this." However, the killer Lt. Col. Khandaker Abdur Rashid's wife and accused Jobaida Rashid said in his deposition, "Criticism was happened among Army officers for providing more facilities by forming Rakkhi Bahini besides the army. I hear these things from Farooq. Major Farooq has been in touch with General Zia since childhood. He was Zia's former acquaintance. One night Major Farooq returned from Zia's house and told my husband that Zia wanted to be president if the government changed. Zia said, "It is a success to come to me. If it is a failure then do not involve me. It is not possible to change the government by keeping Sheikh Mujib alive". Major General (retd) M Khalilur Rahman (then director of BDR) testified, "Some army officers became divided as General Safiullah was not made the army chief despite being a senior on the basis of General Zia's number. I have heard that General Zia will retire from the army and be sent abroad as an ambassador." At one point after the swearing in of the cabinet, Major Rashid introduced me to his wife. I thought Major Rashid was a little proud and said, "She is my wife. My wife is the mastermind behind what we have done." The assassins considered the possible causes of the failure, and for the upcoming after-period after Mujib's assassination, they decided to use a well-wisher from Mujib's Awami League and a person who could be removed in time if desired, in order to curb the possible Indian intervention, the Awami League's vengeful armed opposition, the possible increasing arbitrariness of the anti-Awami League and to temporarily control the situation. After some time of searching, an Awami League cabinet minister under Mujib's government, Khondaker Mostaq Ahmad, agreed to take over the presidency. Journalist Lawrence Lifschultz paints an alternate picture of the conspiracy, however, that implicates Mostaq and the US Central Intelligence Agency (CIA). He claimed that the "CIA station chief in Dhaka, Philip Cherry, was actively involved in the killing of the Father of the Nation—Bangabandhu Sheikh Mujibur Rahman." His claims largely relied on the testimony of a single anonymous businessman, however. It is alleged that the Chief of Army Staff, Major General Kazi Mohammed Shafiullah, and the Directorate General of Forces Intelligence Air Vice Marshal, Aminul Islam Khan, were aware of the conspiracy. Major Faruque told Anthony Mascarenhas that he carried out the assassination following the direction of Andha Hafiz, a blind saint from Chittagong who was known having supernatural powers and his wife Farida helped him communicate with the saint. The saint entitled as a pir told him to carry out the killing in the interest of Islam, advised him to abandon personal interests and carry out the killing at the right time. However, Andha Hafiz later denied the claim in an interview with the weekly Bichinta.

Events

Assassination

In the early hours of Friday, 15 August 1975, the conspirators divided into four groups. One group, consisting of members of the Bengal Lancers of the First Armoured Division and 535th Infantry Division under Major Huda, attacked Mujib's residence.

A correspondent for Anandabazar Patrika, Sukharanjan Dasgupta, who described the Bangladesh Liberation War in Dhaka until 1974, writes in his book Midnight Massacre in Dacca that "the exact details of the massacre will always remain shrouded in mystery". He went on to say that the army platoon protecting the president's house offered no resistance. Sheikh Kamal, son of Mujib, was shot at the reception area on the ground floor.

Meanwhile, Mujib was asked to resign and allowed time to consider his choice. He telephoned Colonel Jamil Uddin Ahmad, the new Chief of Military Intelligence. When Jamil arrived and ordered the troops back to the barracks, he was gunned down at the gate of the residence. After he refused to resign, Mujib was shot and killed.

Other people killed in the attack were Sheikh Fazilatunnesa Mujib, wife of Mujib, who was killed upstairs; Sheikh Nasser, younger brother of Mujib, who was killed in a lavatory; several servants of Mujib, who were also killed in lavatories; Sheikh Jamal, the second son of Mujib and an army officer; ten-year-old Sheikh Russel, the youngest son of Mujib; and two daughters-in-law of Mujib.

In Dhanmondi, two other groups of soldiers killed Sheikh Fazlul Haque Mani, Mujib's nephew and a leader of the Awami League along with his pregnant wife, Arzu Moni, and Abdur Rab Serniabat, Mujib's brother-in-law. They also killed a minister of the government and thirteen of his family members on Mintu Road.

The fourth and most powerful group was sent towards Savar to repel the expected counter-attack by the security forces stationed there. After a brief fight and the loss of eleven men, the security forces surrendered.

Four of the founding leaders of the Awami League, first Prime Minister of Bangladesh Tajuddin Ahmed, former Prime Minister Mansur Ali, former Vice President Syed Nazrul Islam, and former Home Minister A. H. M. Qamaruzzaman, were arrested. Three months later, on 3 November 1975, they were murdered in Dhaka Central Jail.

Aftermath of assassination
On the morning of the assassination, the then Lieutenant Colonel Amin Ahmed Chowdhury entered the house of General Ziaur Rahman and found out on the radio that President Sheikh Mujibur Rahman had been assassinated. He described the incident: "General Zia is shaving on one side but not on the other. Came running in the sleeping suit, he asked Shafaat Jamil, "What happened, Shafaat?" Shafaat replied, "Apparently two battalions staged a coup. We don't know yet what happened outside. We hear the announcement on the radio that the president is dead."  Then General Zia said, "So what? Let vice-president take over. We have nothing to do with politics. Get your troops ready. Uphold the constitution."

Khondaker Mostaq Ahmad assumed the presidency, and Major General Ziaur Rahman became the new Chief of Army Staff. The leading conspirators were all given high government ranks. They were all later toppled by yet another coup led by Brigadier General Khaled Mosharraf on 3 November 1975. Mosharraf himself was killed during a counter-revolt four days later on 7 November, which freed Major General Ziaur Rahman in power and was brought in to bring law and order.

Major Syed Faruque Rahman, Rashid, and the other army officers were promoted to the rank of lieutenant colonel. Nevertheless, they were exiled to Libya, China, Rhodesia, Canada, and other countries, although they were given several diplomatic posts in Bangladeshi missions abroad. Lieutenant Colonel (Rtd.) Syed Faruque Rahman later returned and founded the Bangladesh Freedom Party in 1985 and took part in the presidential election in 1987 against the military ruler Lieutenant General Hussain Mohammad Ershad but lost that election in a landslide.

Mujib's two daughters, Sheikh Hasina and Sheikh Rehana, were in West Germany at the time of his assassination. After the coup, they were barred from returning to Bangladesh and were granted asylum by India. Sheikh Hasina lived in New Delhi in exile before returning to Bangladesh on 17 May 1981.

Trial
The military decided not to court-martial the military officers who masterminded and participated in the coup. A. F. M. Mohitul Islam, personal assistant to Sheikh Mujib and a survivor of the attack on his house, attempted to file a case against the military officers, but the police slapped him in the face and refused to file the report. The assassination conspirators could not be tried in a court of law because of the Indemnity Act passed by the government under President Khondaker Mostaq Ahmad. When the Awami League, led by Mujib's daughter, Sheikh Hasina, won elections in 1996, the act was repealed. The Bangabandhu murder trial began with the case filing by A. F. M. Mohitul Islam.

Colonel (Rtd.) Syed Faruque Rahman was arrested from his Dhaka home, and Colonel (Rtd.) Bazlul Huda was brought back from Bangkok, where he was serving a prison sentence for shoplifting as part of a criminal exchange program between Thailand and Bangladesh. Lieutenant Colonel Mohiuddin Ahmed was in active military service when he was arrested. Colonel (Rtd.) Sultan Shahriar Rashid Khan had been appointed to active diplomatic service by previous Prime Minister of Bangladesh Begum Khaleda Zia, but he returned to Bangladesh and was arrested when he was recalled by the foreign ministry. Colonel (Rtd.) Abdur Rashid and other accused individuals had already left Bangladesh, however. They believed that the upcoming 1996 general election would be an Awami League victory, which would result in the repealing of the Indemnity Act and their subsequent arrest. Colonel (Rtd.) Rashid now reportedly shuttles between Pakistan and Libya. All these men were also involved in Jail Killing on 3 November 1975, when four Awami League officials were assassinated.

The first trial ended on 8 November 1998. The District and Session Judge of Dhaka, Mohammad Golam Rasul, ordered the death sentence by firing squad to fifteen out of the twenty accused of conspiring in the assassination. The sentences were not carried out immediately, because five of the convicts sought to file appeals in the high court division of the Supreme Court of Bangladesh. The Supreme Court, consisting of Justice Mohammad Ruhul Amin and Justice A. B. M. Khairul Haque, who was the former Chief Justice of Bangladesh, gave a divisive verdict. Senior Justice Amin acquitted five out of the original fifteen accused, whereas Junior Justice Haque upheld the lower court's verdict. A verdict from a third judge became necessary. Later, Justice Mohammad Fazlul Karim condemned twelve out of original fifteen, including two acquitted in Justice Amin's verdict. One of the convicts, Major (Rtd.) Aziz Pasha died in Zimbabwe on 2 June 2001.

Although the five accused appealed to the appellate division of the Supreme Court, their decision remained pending from August 2001. Several judges refused to hear the case, which meant the government lacked the three judges required to hold a hearing session. On 18 June 2007, one of the conspirators who had been sentenced to death, Major (Rtd.) A.K.M. Mohiuddin Ahmed was extradited to Bangladesh from the United States following a series of failed attempts to gain asylum or permanent residency in the United States. On 7 August 2007, the murder case hearings resumed after a six-year delay. The appellate division of the Supreme Court of Bangladesh gave its verdict on 19 November 2009, after a five-member special bench, headed by Justice Mahammad Tafazzal Islam, spent 29 days hearing the petition filed by the convicted.

The appeal of the convicts was rejected, and the death sentence was upheld. Before the verdict, approximately 12,000 extra policemen were deployed to guard strategic buildings, including the Supreme Court building, to prevent disruption of the proceedings by the convicted men's supporters. Nevertheless, they were blamed by the government for a grenade attack on one of the prosecution lawyers in October 2009, although no one has been charged yet.

Captain (Rtd.) Qismet Hashem, Captain (Rtd.) Nazmul Hossain Ansar, and Major (Rtd.) Abdul Majid were acquitted through the high court division and appellate division verdicts and now lives in Canada. Taheruddin Thakur, former Information Minister and one of the suspects, was cleared during the Hasina Government, acquitted in trial, and released. He died of natural causes in 2009. Conspirators Major (Rtd.) Bazlul Huda, Lieutenant Colonel (Rtd.) Mohiuddin Ahmed, Major (Rtd.) A.K.M. Mohiuddin Ahmed, Colonel (Rtd.) Syed Faruque Rahman, and Colonel (Rtd.) Sultan Shahriar Rashid Khan were executed by hanging on 28 January 2010.

On 11 April 2020, Abdul Majed was executed by hanging. He had returned to Bangladesh the previous month after being a fugitive for 23 years.

Literary interpretation of the assassination 
Sheikh Mujibur Rahman was assassinated on 15 August 1975 at the dawn on Friday along with all other family members staying at the Dhanmondi 32 on that fateful night. This man is considered as the Father of the nation and keeps behind a legacy that spiritualizes that great man even after his fateful demise..This article describes the literary texts regarding the impact of the assassination of Sheikh Mujibur Rahman. The literary texts are categorized into three sections: (1) the literatures which explain the background of the assassination; (2) the literatures which describe the assassination incidences detailed or implied; and (3) the political polarization after the incidences.

Background in the literature 

The literature, especially the historical literature, ranging from the year of the incident to the recent work explains the causes behind the assassination. There are few literatures that highlight the cause of the military coup, the resentment of the army etc. as the book: Empires at war: a short history of modern Asia since World War II, A Political and Economic Dictionary of South Asia, and Cascades of Violence: War, Crime and Peacebuilding Across South Asia  are few of the many. Again; a sect of literatures highlight the rise of some para militia,Jatiya Rakkhi Bahini, and militant groups, Purba Banglar Sarbahara Party. Bangladesh: A Legacy of Blood is the book which knits the web of these factional elements and their operations in the decade of 70's. The economic meltdown, the flood in 1974 and the famine due to these critical transitions are also exposed in the Democracy and Famine.

Military resentment 
The 15 August 1975 Mujib assassination marks the first direct military intervention in the then administration- centric Bangladesh politics. There are references on the condensation of the political misunderstanding among the “Jatiya Rakkhi Bahini” founded in 1972 by the patronization of Mujib, Mukti Bahini founded during the war time, and the military. It is reported that the military would receive 50-60% funding during the Pakistani period that the Muijb government reduced it to 13% that raised a tacit resentment among the military.

Rise of factional groups 
The Liberation war ended. The occupied forces surrendered and left the country. Bangladesh then had to face a second-level of factionalism among the people in the country that literature portrays. The Good Muslim by Tahmima Anam presents the ravages of war, the confrontation with religious fundamentalism and the socio-political disharmony interplaying in the war torn country. The cover page of the book reads:Set in Bangladesh at a time when Islamic fundamentalism is on the rise, The Good Muslim is an epic story about faith, family and the long shadow of war. Tahmima Anam, the prize-winning author of A Golden Age, offers a moving portrait of a sister and brother who struggle with the competing loyalties of love and belief as they cope with the lasting ravages of war and confront the deeply intimate roots of religious extremism. Echoing the intensity and humanity of Thrity Umrigar's The Space Between Us, Abraham Verghese's Cutting for Stone, and Kiran Desai's The Inheritance of Loss, Anam's "accomplished and gripping novel", in the words of author Pankaj Mishra, "describes not only the tumult of a great historical event, but also the small but heroic struggles of individuals living in the shadow of revolution and war".The period 1971-1975 experienced the changes of role among the veterans due to their new orientation on the socio-economic-political scenarios. Siraj Sikdar was one of them who was one of the front line freedom fighters; yet he had to change his political aesthetics around 1973 and indulged in militancy by the name of "Proletarian Party". Antony Mascarenhas has commented in the "Bangladesh: A Legacy of Blood" (1986) that Shamim Shikder, sister of Siraj Sikder, blames the government for the death of him in the police custody on 3 January 1975.

Economic meltdown 
Olivier Rubin in his book “Democracy and Famine” has remarked that one-party state is a reality if the famine engulfs the fragile democratic society. He pointed out the 1974 famine in Bangladesh as a case study. As a new independent country, Bangladesh had to experience economic crisis. The flood in July and August, 1974 triggered the crisis exponentially. Thus, food scarcity, improper distribution of leftover food reported to have 1 to 1.5 million of death in Bangladesh. This led the then Mujib government in question. And these critical atmospheres led to the assassination of the Father of the nation according to the case study of Olivier Rubin.

Incidents reflected in the literature 
Apart from the news of electronic and print media; the novels, poetry, and performing arts draw the harrowing pictures of the assassination.

Novels 

Deyal (Walls) is a novel by Humayun Ahmed that narrates the assassination of the father of the nation. This is the only novel that takes the assassination of Sheikh Mujibur Rahman as the background, though the novel raised some contradictions on the factual inconsistencies in some cases, and eventually the court declared ruling against the publication of the book without correction.

Critics say that Colonel Farooq, the killer of Bangabandhu, has been shown in this novel as a little great. However, Dr. Syed Manzoorul Islam has a distinct opinion that Humayun Ahmed had allowed him to read the draft copy of the wall. The opinion tells,
 

Deyal may be contradictory on the political ground; but it brings the legacy of Sheikh Mujibur Rahman that implicates the killing was a remarkable moment in the History of Bangladesh.

Literary reflection of the aftermath

Poetry 
The first literary piece on the remembrance of Bangabandhu at his assassination was an elegy. It is reported and well documented that Moulovi Sheikh Abdul Hamid, the close friend of Bangabandhu, at Tungipara  was the first composer of the elegy in the memory of the death of Sheikh Mujibur Rahman. He was the man who laid down the assassinated man in the grave and conducted all the funeral rites. He wrote in emotion:O great one—whose flesh, blood and bones are interred in this grave

Whose light lit up all of Hindustan, and especially Bangladesh

I am dedicating myself to your grave, to you who is lying in this grave.Poetry exceeded in numbers in comparison to other literary media to highlight the aftereffect of the assassination on 15 August 1975 and afterwards linked to the assassination of the founder of the nation. Nirmalendu Goon, Syed Shamsul Haque, Shamsur Rahman, Mahadev Saha were remarkable poets whose pen raised concern for the death of the father of the nation. Nirmalendu Goon was outspoken in his poems to celebrate the legacy of Bangabandhu. He has three great poems on Bangabandhu that goes-

 Sei Rattrir Kolpokahini ("A Tale of That Night")
 Swadhinota- Eai Sobdo Ti Kivabe Amader Holo ( Liberation: How We Owned this Word)[2]
 Let me speak out Bangabandhu in the poems!

A Tale of That Night draws the crimson picture of the fateful night of the vile assassination. The stanza of the poem goes;Your legs didn't stagger even for once

Nor did your eyes twitch;

To stop wastage of bullets of the coup de tat

You thrust forth your chest, for you know,

Every bullet costs more than a farmer's meal. (“A Tale of That Night”) The poet, Nurul Huda, directly hinted to the loss of the country that Bangadesh had on the 15th August, 1975. His poem Fifteen August speaks;

Today it's empty and blazing all around,

Today all feel shattered to the core in grief,

All over Radha, Vanga, Harikela, Samatata ,

Let heavy rains pour on the Bangalees' thunderstruck chest (p. 7)

The poets of the West Bengal were likely moved by this incidents and they had to write elegiac notes, and eulogy for Bangabandhu. The name of the Poet, Annada Shankar Roy comes first. The poet and essayist writes in his poem, Bangabandhu thatAs long as the rivers Padma, Jamuna,

Gauri, Meghna run,

So long will survive your glory

Sheikh Mujibur Rahman. (Bangabandhu)     Shamsur Rahman had political and historical conscience and he could duly reflect them in his poetry. The being of Bangladesh and its struggle against tyranny is visible in the lines. Bangabandhu covered a great spaces in his writings related to the liberation war, political upheavals and even the assassination taken place in 1975. The poems referred highlight the loss, repentance, agony, and anger for the perpetrators who grasped the statue of freedom to vandalize it:  

"Bangladesh Swapna Dekhe", (Bangladesh dreams)

"Dhaynya Sei Purush", (The Successful Man)

"Nam", (Name)

"Bhaskar Purush", (An Enlightened Man)

"Tomar Nam Ek Biplab", (Revolution is Thy Name)

'Sonar Murtir Kahini, (A History of Golden Statue)

The writer did not stop here only with the drops of tears. He dreamed of the revenge for this. Here "The Song of Electra" (Electrar Gaan) in the poetry "The Sky of Ikarus" (Ikraser Akash) (1982) reveals the motif of vengeance with the allusion of the mythical story of Electra who had intension to avenge for the killing of her father "Agamemnon". She reveals "My heat burns as a Red Hibiscus with the fire of Vengeance" (64).

Movies 
After the carnage happened on 15 August 1975; several coups de tat took place and 3 November 1975 killing of the four national leaders in the custody was second in importance. Yet, few grand literatures are written in these clamorous times of Bangladeshi history. However, August 1975, a film directed by Shamim Ahamed Roni and produced by Selim Khan is a memorable contribution in the case of performing art. This movie portrays the dusky situations prevailing after the assassination of Sheikh Mujibur Rahman.Thus, the film is an addition to the realm of literary history that could make the after-assassination visualize through the literary pieces

Songs  
A song that creates an eternal appeal is "Jodi Raat Pohale Shona Jeto" (If the dawn spread the resurrection).    If the dawn spread the resurrection

Of Bangabandhu,

If the highways became crowdy with procession

That 'We want His freedom';

The world could have a great leader

The Bangalee could get their father.  

The man never bowed down like a coward,

Before the tyrants and miscreants,

He rather snatched back our freedom

From the clutches of heinous occupants.

No one is so great a Bangalee

That the history repeats someday,

You can never cover up the truth

That will peep out of the fake. Hasan Matiur Raham is the song writer; Moloy Kumar Ganguly is the music composer and the singer for this song. In 1990, Matiur Rahman wrote this song and Moloy Kumar, the singer for the Swadhin Bangla Betar Kendra composed the music. He expressed that it took 15 minutes for him to make it as a song. This song first recorded in the production company of Hasan Matiur Rahman in 1991 for the election campaign of Bangladesh Awami League. This song is made to sing by Sabina Yasmin in 1997 and Farid Ahmed arranged the music for this remake.

See also
 15 August 1975 Bangladesh coup d'état
 Assassination of Khaled Mosharraf
 Assassination of Ziaur Rahman
 Assassination of Mahatma Gandhi
 Assassination of Indira Gandhi
 Assassination of Rajiv Gandhi
 Assassination of Benazir Bhutto
 Bangladesh: A Legacy of Blood
 Bangladesh Krishak Sramik Awami League
 Civil–military relations
 Deyal
 Jail Killing Day
 Military coups in Bangladesh
 National Revolution and Solidarity Day
 Second Revolution (Bangladesh)
 Trojan War
 Invasion of Banu Qaynuqa

References

Further reading 
 

 
1975 mass shootings in Asia
1975 murders in Bangladesh
1970s coups d'état and coup attempts
1990s trials
1970s in Dhaka
Assassinations in Bangladesh
August 1975 crimes
August 1975 events in Asia
Mass murder in 1975
Military coups in Bangladesh
Murder in Dhaka
Murder trials
Sheikh Mujibur Rahman
Trials in Bangladesh
20th-century mass murder in Bangladesh
Femicide
Violence against women
Sexual harassment
Assault
Mass murder in Bangladesh
Deception operations
Sexual abuse